Back to Life is a 2004 novel, the first book by author Wendy Coakley-Thompson. It was nominated for the 2004 Romantic Times magazine's Best First Multicultural Novel Award. The title for the book was inspired by the Soul II Soul hit of the same name.

Plot introduction

Set in 1989 New Jersey, it tells the story of the turbulent interracial relationship of Lisa, who is Black, and Marc, who is Italian-American. The book also explores how incidents in New York City influence the politics and social climate of northern New Jersey.

Plot summary

Lisa is facing 30, is three months away from ending her acrimonious divorce from Bryan, and is constantly rebuffing her child psychologist/writer mother, who questions her daughter's life decisions. Marc, in between plugging his successful novel Goombah, is a star professor at the State College of New Jersey, which is poised to become a university. Nina and Tim Simon, a mixed couple and mutual friends, attempt to bring Lisa and Marc together at a party in Montclair, New Jersey on the very night that an Italian mob in Bensonhurst, Brooklyn murders Yusuf Hawkins, a Black teen.

Nina and Tim have their matchmaking work cut out for them. Lisa and Bryan constantly wrangle over community property. Lisa, by some registration fluke, winds up in Marc's class. A.J., Lisa's militant friend, drives Lisa incessantly to prove her Blackness. Marc receives word that Michele, his ex-wife, is about to remarry, forcing him to re-evaluate his feelings for her. Demonstrations and hate crimes plague the campus and stress the college's chancellor, who is fixated on seeing the college become a university. All these activities are interwoven with the charged political context of the New York City mayoral race, which ends in Democratic Party (United States) candidate David Dinkins beating Republican Party (United States) candidate Rudy Giuliani to become the city's first Black mayor.

When Lisa and Marc finally do become a couple, interpersonal conflicts, along with racist and prejudiced family and friends, an ambitious college chancellor, Michele, and a showdown at Lisa's job threaten the union. Lisa, stressed, crashes her car on her way home and lapses into a coma. A bedside vigil ensues. Bryan agrees to the terms of the divorce. Marc decides to take a fellowship in San Diego. Lisa's mother rushes to her.

Lisa regains consciousness. She and her mother come to an understanding. On his way out of town, Marc visits Lisa, and they negotiate their way to love. On the way to San Diego, they marry in Las Vegas. Lisa is on the balcony overlooking La Jolla Cove at sunset. Marc returns home, and Lisa informs him that the EPT stick has turned blue...

Release details
US trade paperback edition: September 2004 Kensington Books
US paperback edition: June 2005 Kensington Books

References

2004 American novels
Novels set in New York City
Novels by Wendy Coakley-Thompson
Novels set in New Jersey
Interracial romance novels
African-American novels
Fiction set in 1989
2004 debut novels
Kensington Books books